1 Giant Leap is a British electronic music duo consisting of the two principal artists, Jamie Catto (Faithless founding member) and Duncan Bridgeman.

Career
Based in the UK, the two musicians set out to create a multimedia project that would encompass a CD, DVD and cinematic presentation that would offer a complete artistic statement. The project offers music, digital video footage shot over the course of six months by Catto and Bridgeman, images, rhythms and spoken word content.

The band was signed to the Palm record label and its eponymous CD was released on 9 April 2002. It features contributions from Dennis Hopper, Kurt Vonnegut, Michael Stipe, Robbie Williams, Eddi Reader, Tom Robbins, Brian Eno, Baaba Maal, Speech, Asha Bhosle, Neneh Cherry, Anita Roddick, Michael Franti, Zap Mama, and other artists and authors. The band's theme for the project is "Unity Through Diversity". A making-of was also shown on the Discovery Channel, which featured some of the effort involved in finding and working with the musicians and other people involved in the project.

1 Giant Leap's "My Culture" video for their first top ten single, featuring Robbie Williams and Maxi Jazz from Faithless, received extensive airplay.

In 2004, they moved on to a deal with Simon Fuller and 19 Entertainment to make a second film and album titled What About Me? The concept was the same as their initial CD and DVD—travelling the world interviewing artists and sampling music—though the second time around their journey was longer (four years) and doubling the number of contributing artists from their debut release.

Reception 
In a review for NPR's All Things Considered, Charles deLedesma said that the album and DVD had "an uphill marketing struggle ... because it isn't easily pigeonholed. But that's its real strength, too. This production presents a luscious, cohesive collection of images, ideas and extremely beautiful world music, which flows here with the voices of three continents."

Discography

Albums

Video albums

Singles

References

External links
What About Me? website
1 Giant Leap website
1 Giant Leap at Palm Pictures

Film/Music Project inspired by 1 Giant Leap
1 Giant Leap Discography
Full History at Sound On Sound
1 Giant Leap at Palmpictures.co.uk

English electronic music duos
Multimedia works
British world music groups
Trip hop groups
Musical groups established in 2001
2001 establishments in England
Palm Pictures artists